Calybites hauderi is a moth of the family Gracillariidae. It is known from Romania and the Pyrenees, but is very rare and local. The records of this species in Great Britain and Belgium were due to the confusion with another species, Caloptilia onustella.

The wingspan is about 10 mm. Adults are on wing in July and August, overwintering as an adult.

The larvae feed on Acer campestre. They mine the leaves of their host plant. The mine consists of a fairly long, lower-surface corridor that is found on the under side of the leaf. The mine becomes a blotch-mine. Older larvae live freely in rolled up leaves.

References

Gracillariinae
Moths of Europe]
Moths described in 1906